Dihydrolipoyllysine-residue succinyltransferase component of 2-oxoglutarate dehydrogenase complex, mitochondrial is an enzyme that in humans is encoded by the DLST gene.

Interactive pathway map

References

Further reading

Mitochondrial proteins